Buellia is a genus of mostly lichen-forming fungi in the family Caliciaceae. The fungi are usually part of a crustose lichen. In this case, the lichen species is given the same name as the fungus. But members may also grow as parasites on lichens (lichenicolous). The algae in the lichen (the photobiont partner) is always a member of the genus Trebouxia.

Lichens in the genus are commonly called disc lichens, or button lichens. The genus has a widespread distribution and contains about 450 species.

Genetic studies indicate that the genus Amandinea and Buellia may be the same, although this is not widely accepted.

Species

Buellia abstracta
Buellia asterella
Buellia badia
Buellia concinna
Buellia disciformis
Buellia dispersa
Buellia spuria

Gallery

References

Caliciales genera
Lichen genera
Taxa described in 1846
Taxa named by Giuseppe De Notaris